Luchino Visconti (also spelled Lucchino, 1287 or 1292 – January 24, 1349) was lord of Milan from 1339 to 1349. He was also a condottiero, and lord of Pavia.

Biography
Ruler of Pavia from 1315, five years later he was podestà of Vigevano, where he erected the castle that is still visible. In 1323, along with all his family, he was excommunicated with the charge of heresy.  The charges of heresy and excommunication were later withdrawn and he became a Papal Vicar in 1341.

He co-ruled in Milan with his nephew Azzone Visconti and his brother Giovanni, until Azzones's death in 1339. He also took part in the victorious battle of Parabiago against his other nephew, Lodrisio, who had set a mercenary army to capture Milan.

With an army of mercenaries from northern Europe, which he entrusted to the sons of his brother Stefano, he expanded the duchy, capturing Pisa and buying Parma from Obizzo III d'Este.

Luchino Visconti was a patron of both music and literature, having invited Petrarch to Milan.

He married three times: to Violante of Saluzzo, daughter of Thomas I of Saluzzo, then to Caterina Spinola, daughter of Obizzo Spinola, and, in 1349, to Isabella Fieschi, niece of Pope Adrian V, who gave Luchino Visconti his sole legitimate son, Luchino Novello, although others of the Visconti later disputed his parentage. He was a capable military commander and lord, but was also famous for his cruel behaviour. In January 1349 he discovered Isabella's unfaithful behaviour, and announced for her a terrible punishment. A few days later he was found poisoned, the people soon nicknaming his wife Isabella del veleno ("Isabella of poison").

He was succeeded by his nephews Bernabò, Galeazzo and Matteo II, whom he had exiled from Milan in 1346. The infidelities of Isabella were used by him and his relatives to oust Luchino Novello from the heritage.

Ancestry

References 

1292 births
1349 deaths
14th-century condottieri
People temporarily excommunicated by the Catholic Church
Luchino
Assassinated Italian people
Rulers of Milan